The 2003 NCAA Division I men's basketball tournament involved 65 schools playing in single-elimination play to determine the national champion of men's NCAA Division I college basketball. It began on March 18, 2003, and ended with the championship game on April 7 in New Orleans, Louisiana at the Superdome. A total of 64 games were played.

The Final Four consisted of Kansas, making their second straight appearance, Marquette, making their first appearance since they won the national championship in 1977, Syracuse, making their first appearance since 1996, and Texas, making their first appearance since 1947. Texas was the only top seed to advance to the Final Four; the other three (Arizona, Kentucky, and Oklahoma) advanced as far as the Elite Eight but fell.

Syracuse won their first national championship in three tries under Jim Boeheim, defeating Kansas 81–78 in what would be Roy Williams' final game as head coach of the team; he would depart to become the head coach at North Carolina, a position he held before retiring after the 2020–2021 season.

Carmelo Anthony of Syracuse was named the tournament's Most Outstanding Player.

Syracuse beat four Big 12 teams on its way to the title: Oklahoma State, Oklahoma, Texas, and Kansas. Those victories helped earn Boeheim the national title that had eluded him in 1987 and 1996.

Schedule and venues

The following are the sites that were selected to host each round of the 2003 tournament:

Opening Round
March 18
University of Dayton Arena, Dayton, Ohio (Host: University of Dayton)

First and Second Rounds
March 20 and 22
 Ford Center, Oklahoma City, Oklahoma (Host: Big 12 Conference)
 Jon M. Huntsman Center, Salt Lake City, Utah (Host: University of Utah)
 RCA Dome, Indianapolis, Indiana (Hosts: Butler University and Horizon League)
 Spokane Veterans Memorial Arena, Spokane, Washington (Host: Washington State University)
March 21 and 23
 BJCC Arena, Birmingham, Alabama (Host: Southeastern Conference)
 FleetCenter, Boston, Massachusetts (Host: Boston College)
 Gaylord Entertainment Center, Nashville, Tennessee (Host: Vanderbilt University)
 St. Pete Times Forum, Tampa, Florida (Host: University of South Florida)

Regional semifinals and finals (Sweet Sixteen and Elite Eight)
March 27 and 29
Midwest Regional, Hubert H. Humphrey Metrodome, Minneapolis, Minnesota (Host: University of Minnesota)
West Regional, Arrowhead Pond of Anaheim, Anaheim, California (Host: Big West Conference)
March 28 and 30
East Regional, Pepsi Arena, Albany, New York (Host: Metro Atlantic Athletic Conference and Siena College)
South Regional, Alamodome, San Antonio, Texas (Host: University of Texas at San Antonio)

National semifinals and championship (Final Four and championship)
April 5 and 7
Louisiana Superdome, New Orleans, Louisiana (Host: Sun Belt Conference and University of New Orleans)

Qualifying teams

Automatic bids
The following teams were automatic qualifiers for the 2003 NCAA field by virtue of winning their conference's tournament (except for the Ivy League, whose regular-season champion received the automatic bid).

Listed by region and seeding

BYU bracketing switch
When the bracket was first revealed, it contained a mistake that would have forced BYU, a Mormon-run school, to play its potential Elite 8 game on a Sunday, which is against school policy. As a solution, the selection committee had a plan to switch BYU, the 12 seed in the Friday-Sunday South regional, with the team that reached the Sweet 16 in the Thursday-Saturday Midwest regional (either Wisconsin, Weber State, Dayton, or Tulsa) should the Cougars advance to the Sweet 16. BYU lost its first-round game to Connecticut, which meant no switches were necessary.

Bids by conference

Final Four

At Louisiana Superdome, New Orleans

National semifinals
April 5, 2003
Syracuse (E3) 95, Texas (S1) 84
Freshman Carmelo Anthony scored 33 points leading the Syracuse Orangemen past the Texas Longhorns in the night cap of the national semifinal doubleheader. Syracuse opened up a comfortable 2nd half lead, but that was trimmed to four with just 1:08 remaining. However, freshman Gerry McNamara iced the game with clutch foul shooting in the final minutes. The win put Syracuse and coach Jim Boeheim one win away from their first ever National Championship. Texas was the last number one seed remaining in the tournament.
Kansas (W2) 94, Marquette (M3) 61
The Kansas Jayhawks routed the Marquette Golden Eagles by 33 points, the fourth largest blowout in Final Four history. Keith Langford led the Jayhawks with 24 points, and Kirk Hinrich and Aaron Miles each added 18 points. Dwyane Wade led Marquette in scoring with 19 points in the loss. Like Boeheim, Kansas coach Roy Williams was just one win away from winning his first ever National Championship.

Championship game

April 7, 2003
Syracuse (E3) 81, Kansas (W2) 78
 Leading up to the championship game, much of the conversation revolved around how, no matter the outcome, one of the well-known head coaches would win their first championship. In Jim Boeheim's 27 years as head coach at Syracuse his team had been to two previous Final Fours, and finished runner-up each time (1987, 1996).   Roy Williams, during his fifteen seasons as Kansas head coach, had reached the Final Four three previous times, and finished runner up once (1991).  Syracuse dominated with a hot shooting first half to lead by 11 at the break. Gerry McNamara connected on an impressive six three-pointers in the half, which were his 18 points for the game. Kansas fought back to within 80–78 in the final minute and had a chance to tie after Hakim Warrick missed a pair of free throws in the final moments; free throws were a major problem throughout the game for Kansas, who went 12-for-30 in attempts. Warrick then blocked Michael Lee's three point attempt with 1.5 seconds remaining on the game clock, followed by Kirk Hinrich's three-pointer at the buzzer going over the net. Kansas' free throw struggles would prove costly in giving Syracuse and Jim Boeheim their first ever national championship. Carmelo Anthony was named Most Outstanding Player (MOP) with 20 points and 10 Rebounds in the win. Syracuse also avenged a second-round loss to Kansas two years earlier.

Bracket
* – Denotes overtime period

Opening Round game
Winner advances to 16th seed in South Regional vs. (1) Texas.

East Regional – Albany, New York

South Regional – San Antonio, Texas

Midwest Regional – Minneapolis, Minnesota

West Regional – Anaheim, California

Final Four – New Orleans, Louisiana

Broadcast information
Originally, CBS Sports was to have shown all 63 games of the tournament following the opening round, which was on ESPN. However, because of the start of the Iraq War the night before, the afternoon games on Thursday and Friday were moved to ESPN while retaining CBS graphics and production. CBS News then joined other broadcast and non-broadcast outlets in showing extended news coverage.

Thursday and Friday night's games were shown on CBS, albeit with frequent news updates. To make up for lost advertising revenue, an additional time slot was opened the following Sunday evening for more CBS telecasts.

2003 also marked the debut of Mega March Madness as an exclusive package on DirecTV. This offered additional game broadcasts not available to the viewer's home market during the first three rounds of the tournament. All games from the 4th round (Elite Eight) onward were national telecasts.

Westwood One had exclusive national radio coverage.

CBS Sports announcers
Jim Nantz and Billy Packer/Bonnie Bernstein – First & Second Round at Nashville, Tennessee; West Regional at Anaheim, California; Final Four at New Orleans, Louisiana
Dick Enberg and Matt Guokas/Kareem Abdul-Jabbar/Armen Keteyian – First & Second Round at Salt Lake City, Utah; South Regional at San Antonio, Texas
Verne Lundquist and Bill Raftery/Lesley Visser – First & Second Round at Boston, Massachusetts; Midwest Regional at Minneapolis, Minnesota
Gus Johnson and Len Elmore/Solomon Wilcots – First & Second Round at Indianapolis, Indiana; East Regional at Albany, New York
Kevin Harlan and Jay Bilas – First & Second Round at Oklahoma City, Oklahoma
Ian Eagle and Jim Spanarkel – First & Second Round at Tampa, Florida
Craig Bolerjack and Dan Bonner – First & Second Round at Birmingham, Alabama
Tim Brando and Bob Wenzel – First & Second Round at Spokane, Washington

Westwood One announcers

First and second rounds

Doug Kennedy and Richard Larsen

Regionals

Final Four

See also
 2003 NCAA Division II men's basketball tournament
 2003 NCAA Division III men's basketball tournament
 2003 NCAA Division I women's basketball tournament
 2003 NCAA Division II women's basketball tournament
 2003 NCAA Division III women's basketball tournament
 2003 National Invitation Tournament
 2002 Women's National Invitation Tournament
 2003 NAIA Division I men's basketball tournament
 2003 NAIA Division II men's basketball tournament
 2003 NAIA Division I women's basketball tournament
 2003 NAIA Division II women's basketball tournament

References

NCAA Division I men's basketball tournament
Ncaa
NCAA Division I men's basketball tournament
NCAA Division I men's basketball tournament
NCAA Division I men's basketball tournament
Basketball
Basketball competitions in San Antonio